Bridgeton railway station serves the Bridgeton district of Glasgow, Scotland and is a station on the Argyle Line,  south east of . The station is operated by ScotRail who also provide all train services.

History 
Called Bridgeton Cross Station, it opened on 1 November 1895 when the line between Glasgow Green and Rutherglen was opened by the Glasgow Central Railway. Westbound services ran to Stobcross, from where they could proceed to  via ,  and points north via the connection to the Stobcross Railway or on to the Lanarkshire and Dunbartonshire Railway to Dumbarton and Balloch Central via Partick Central & Dalmuir Riverside.

In 1956 the line was re-signalled with colour light signals controlled from the re-equipped signal boxes at Bridgeton Cross Junction and Stobcross Junction. However, the station was closed along with both lines on 5 October 1964 as a result of the Beeching Axe. The tracks were subsequently lifted, but the station and tunnels were left intact.

As part of the Argyle Line project, the Rutherglen line platforms reopened as Bridgeton Station on 5 November 1979, as offering regular commuter services into Central Station (low level) and on towards the western suburbs.

In preparation for the 2014 Commonwealth Games, the station underwent substantial renovations in 2010.

Accidents and incidents
On 2 February 1929, a passenger train was diverted into the bay platform due to a signalman's error. Several people were injured when the train crashed through the buffers.

Services

1979 

2008 
Four trains per hour daily head westbound towards Glasgow Central and beyond (Milngavie and Dalmuir) and eastbound towards  (with services onward to Lanark).

2015 
The basic four trains per hour frequency remains unchanged, but since the December 2014 timetable recast southbound trains now run to either Motherwell via Hamilton Central or via  (though alternate services on that route terminate at Whifflet). On Sundays, southbound trains also serve Larkhall every hour and  every 30 minutes.

Routes

References 

Sources
 
 

Railway stations in Glasgow
Former Caledonian Railway stations
Railway stations in Great Britain opened in 1895
Railway stations in Great Britain closed in 1964
Railway stations in Great Britain opened in 1979
Reopened railway stations in Great Britain
SPT railway stations
Railway stations served by ScotRail
Beeching closures in Scotland
Bridgeton–Calton–Dalmarnock